The VL10 (ru: ВЛ10) is an electric two-unit mainline DC freight locomotive used in the Soviet Union and is still operated today by the state owned Russian rail company RZhD, Ukrainian Railways and Georgian Railway. The initials VL are those of Vladimir Lenin (ru: Владимир Ленин), after whom the class is named.

History
The VL10 series was built as a replacement for the ageing VL8 which, by 1960, no longer met Soviet rail requirements. The VL10s were manufactured at the Tbilisi Electric Locomotive Works (ТЭВЗ) between 1961–1977, as well as the Novocherkassk Electric Locomotive Plant (НЭВЗ) during 1969 and 1976. It was also there that all the mechanical components for the series were produced. The first prototype of the VL10 series was built in the Tbilisi works under the designation Т8-001. It was built in 1961 to coincide with the 40th anniversary of Soviet rule in Georgia.

Gallery

See also
 Novocherkassk Electric Locomotive Plant
 Russian Railway Museum
 Museum of the Moscow Railway (Moscow Rizhsky station)
 History of rail transport in Russia

References 

Electric locomotives of Russia
Electric locomotives of Ukraine
Electric locomotives of Armenia
Electric locomotives of Georgia
Electric locomotives of the Soviet Union
3000 V DC locomotives
Bo′Bo′+Bo′Bo′ locomotives
Railway locomotives introduced in 1961
5 ft gauge locomotives